Sheila Diane McNeill (born February 15, 1943) is an American politician from Georgia. McNeill was a Republican member of the Georgia State Senate for the 3rd district.

Political career 
McNeill was elected to the Georgia State Senate for the 3rd district. She is vice chair of the natural resources and the environment committee, secretary of the veterans, military and homeland security committee and a member of the education and youth committee and the state institutions and property committee.

References

21st-century American politicians
Living people
21st-century American women politicians
1943 births